Basil Arthur O’Ferrall  (24 August 1924 – 23 June 2006) was an Anglican priest in the second half of the 20th century.

He was born on 24 August 1924 and educated at St Patrick’s Cathedral Grammar School, Dublin and Trinity College in the same city. He was  ordained in 1948 and began his ecclesiastical career with a curacy at St Patrick’s, Coleraine after which he became a  naval chaplain. He served on amongst others , HMS Ganges, HMS Adamant and HMS Victorious before becoming Chaplain of the Fleet and Archdeacon of the Royal Navy, a post he held from 1975 to 1980. An Honorary Chaplain to the Queen, he was Vicar of Ranworth with Woodbastwick  before becoming Dean of Jersey in 1985. He retired in 1993; and died on 23 June 2006.

Notes and references

1924 births
2006 deaths
Civil servants from Dublin (city)
Alumni of Trinity College Dublin
Chaplains of the Fleet
Deans of Jersey
Church of England archdeacons (military)
Companions of the Order of the Bath
Honorary Chaplains to the Queen